Marc Larose (born 23 June 1959) is a Seychellois sprinter. He competed in the men's 100 metres, men's 4 x 100 metres relay and the men's 4 x 400 metres relay  at the 1980 Summer Olympics.

References

External links
 

1959 births
Living people
Athletes (track and field) at the 1980 Summer Olympics
Seychellois male sprinters
Olympic athletes of Seychelles
Place of birth missing (living people)